Barind Multipurpose Development Authority is a Bangladesh government development authority under the Ministry of Agriculture responsible for development of Barind Tract. Begum Akhter Jahan is Chairman of the authority.

History
Barind Integrated Area Development Project was established in 1985 to develop the Barind Tract under the authority of Bangladesh Agricultural Development Corporation. The project was completed in 1990 and had only used 26 percent of its original budget. On 15 June 1992 the project was reconstituted as the Barind Multipurpose Development Authority under the Ministry of Agriculture.

References

1992 establishments in Bangladesh
Organisations based in Dhaka
Government agencies of Bangladesh
Government departments of Bangladesh